Svenska Cupen 1967 was the thirteenth season of the main Swedish football Cup. The competition was concluded on 1 November 1967 with the Final, held at Idrottsparken, Norrköping. Malmö FF won 2-0 against IFK Norrköping before an attendance of 11,707 spectators.

First qualifying round
For all results see SFS-Bolletinen - Matcher i Svenska Cupen.

Second qualifying round
For all results see SFS-Bolletinen - Matcher i Svenska Cupen.

First round
For all results see SFS-Bolletinen - Matcher i Svenska Cupen.

Second round
For all results see SFS-Bolletinen - Matcher i Svenska Cupen.

Third round
For all results see SFS-Bolletinen - Matcher i Svenska Cupen.

Fourth round
For all results see SFS-Bolletinen - Matcher i Svenska Cupen.

Quarter-finals
The 4 matches in this round were played between 31 August and 20 September 1967.

Semi-finals
The semi-finals in this round were played on 28 September 1967.

Final
The final was played on 1 November 1967 at Idrottsparken.

Footnotes

References 

1967
Cup
Sweden